The West African slender-snouted crocodile (Mecistops cataphractus), or slender-snouted crocodile, is a critically endangered species of African crocodile. It is one of five species of crocodile in Africa, the other four being the Central African slender-snouted, Nile, West African and dwarf crocodiles. 

The slender-snouted crocodile (M. cataphractus) was thought to be distributed across west Africa and into central Africa but the central African species has been separated as the Central African slender-snouted crocodile (M. leptorhynchus) based on studies in 2014 and 2018 that indicated that both were distinct species. The name cataphractus is retained for the West African species as that species was described first based on specimens from western Africa. The two species diverged about 6.5–7.5 mya, living in different river drainage zones that were geographically separated from each other by the Cameroon Line.

Etymology
The genus name Mecistops is most probably derived from the Ancient Greek words μήκιστ (mēkist) meaning "longest" and ὄψις (ópsis) meaning "aspect" or "appearance". The species name cataphractus is thought to be derived from the Greek word κατάφρακτος (katáphraktos) meaning "armoured" or "shielded".

Description
As with its relative, the West African slender-snouted crocodile has a very long, slender snout that it uses to catch fish and small aquatic invertebrates. As with all crocodilians, larger animals may feed opportunistically on larger prey if it becomes available. They are relatively medium-sized, but large males can exceed several other species of crocodilians in size. They prefer to live in dense, vegetated bodies of water.

Status
This species is relatively poorly known with few studies of the wild populations. Consequently, it was rated as Data Deficient by the IUCN in 1996. Following a review in 2014, it was moved to Critically Endangered, although this includes both the Central African and West African species. It appears to have been entirely extirpated from several countries where formerly present and declined elsewhere. In its native range, it is extremely rare and on the verge of disappearing. A study in 2015 that included 24 captive slender-snouted crocodiles in six US zoos (more than 50% of the slender-snouted crocodiles in AZA zoos) found that all were of West African origin, indicating that captive breeding may be important for conservation of this species.

Distribution
West African slender-snouted crocodile occurs widely in West Africa (Benin, Burkina Faso, southern Senegal, Gambia, Ghana, Guinea, Guinea-Bissau, Ivory Coast, Liberia, southern Mali, Nigeria, Sierra Leone, and Togo) and extends into Cameroon in Central Africa.

References

Crocodylidae
crocodile, Slender-snouted
crocodile, Slender-snouted
Reptiles of Cameroon
Reptiles of West Africa
Reptiles described in 1825
Taxa named by Georges Cuvier